Dacrydium xanthandrum is a species of conifer in the family Podocarpaceae. It is found in Indonesia, Malaysia, Papua New Guinea, and the Philippines.

References

xanthandrum
Least concern plants
Taxonomy articles created by Polbot